Warrap is a Town in Warrap State, South Sudan. Before the creation of new states in 2015, it was the capital of the state of Tonj State in South Sudan. It has since been supplanted as the capital by Kuajok.

References

Populated places in Warrap (state)

ar:واراب
id:Warab (negara bagian)